Desmarestia anceps is a species of brown algae found in the Antarctic Peninsula.

References 

Desmarestiales
Taxa named by Camille Montagne